The 1994 Mercedes Cup,  was a men's tennis tournament played on outdoor clay courts and held at the Tennis Club Weissenhof in Stuttgart, Germany that was part of the Championship Series of the 1994 ATP Tour. It was the 17th edition of the tournament was held from 18 July until 25 July 1994. Fourth-seeded Alberto Berasategui won the singles title.

Finals

Singles

 Alberto Berasategui defeated  Andrea Gaudenzi, 7–5, 6–3, 7–6(7–5)
 It was Berasategui's second singles title of the year and 3rd of his career.

Doubles

 Scott Melville /  Piet Norval defeated  Jacco Eltingh /  Paul Haarhuis, 7–6, 7–5

References

External links
 Official website 
 ITF tournament edition details
 ATP tournament profile

Stuttgart Open
Stuttgart Open
1994 in German tennis